Shikhar may refer to
 Shikhara, a Sanskrit word translating literally to "mountain peak"
Guru Shikhar, a peak in the Arbuda Mountains, India
Shikhar (given name)
Shikhar (film), a 2005 Indian film
Shikhar Dhawan, Indian cricketer
Shikhar, Doti, a municipality in Nepal